Naked cuticle 2 (NKD2) is a human gene that encodes the protein Nkd2, one of the Naked cuticle (Nkd) family of proteins that regulate the Wnt signaling pathway.  Both Nkd1 and Nkd2 proteins can bind to Dishevelled proteins (DVL1, DVL2, DVL3), but only Nkd2 can bind to the EGF-ligand family member TGF alpha and regulate its polarized secretion in cultured epithelial cells.

Sources 

Human proteins